Louis Joseph Bahin (1813-1857) was a French-born American painter in the Antebellum South.

Early life
Louis Joseph Bahin was born on October 6, 1813, in Armentières en Brie/Isles, Seine & Marne France.

Career
Bahin exhibited his paintings in Marseille, Southern France, from 1832 to 1845.

Bahin became a landscape painter and portraitist in the Antebellum South, especially in Natchez, Mississippi, and painted many members of the Southern aristocracy. For example, he did a portrait of planter Levin R. Marshall and his son, George M. Marshall, which now hangs in the dining-room at Lansdowne, their family mansion.

His work can also be found in public galleries and museums. For example, his painting, Natchez Under the Hill, is exhibited at the Morris Museum of Art in Augusta, Georgia. Other paintings can be found at the Abby Aldrich Rockefeller Folk Art Museum in Williamsburg, Virginia, the Mississippi Department of Archives and History in Jackson, Mississippi, and the Western Reserve Historical Society in Cleveland, Ohio.

Personal life and death
Bahin was married to Josephine Carementrand. He died on June 27, 1857, in Mississippi.

Paintings
Uyatt Crittenden Webb Family, Georgetown, Kentucky (circa 1835).
Henry LeGrand Conner (1803-1848) (circa 1840s).
Portrait of a Young Girl (circa 1840–50).
Louis Joseph Bahin (1813-1857) (1847).
Gustave Joseph Bahin (1841-1913) (circa 1848).
Portrait of George M. Marshall, I (1848-1857).
Young Lady in a French Kitchen (1852).
Mrs Louis Joseph Bahin (1811-1861). (1852).
Henry Clay (1852).
Natchez Under the Hill (1852).
Mary Savage Conner Blake (1827-1893) (circa 1852).
Anna Frances Conner (1835-1852) (circa 1852).
Joseph Dunbar Shields (1854).
Young Man in the Bahin Family (1854).
Mrs. Miles Harper (Samantha Ford) (1859).
John Ford Harper (1859).
Truman Holmes, Jr. (1864).

References

1813 births
1857 deaths
People from Armentières
People from Natchez, Mississippi
French emigrants to the United States
19th-century French painters
19th-century American painters
French male painters
American male painters
Painters from Mississippi
19th-century French male artists
19th-century American male artists